"That's Love" is a song by English singer Billy Fury with vocal group the Four Jays, released as a single in May 1960. It peaked at number 19 on the Record Retailer Top 50.

Release and reception
"That's Love" was released as the only single from Fury's debut album The Sound of Fury, yet neither single nor album were particularly successful, with both only briefly appearing on their respective charts. As with the rest of the album, "That's Love" and its B-side "You Don't Know" were written by Fury, although the latter under the pseudonym Wilber Wilberforce.

Reviewing for Disc, Don Nicholl described Fury as "rocking on a comfortable winner in "That's Love"" and that "it should register happily in all the juke areas and I am also tipping it to climb into the big selling league". He also described "You Don't Know" as "almost a talker. Extremely slow with piano and guitar behind Billy. I think he tends to over-dramatise this half".

Track listing
7": Decca / F 11237
 "That's Love" – 1:48
 "You Don't Know" – 2:28

Personnel
 Billy Fury – vocals
 Joe Brown – guitar
 Reg Guest – piano
 Alan Weighall – electric bass guitar
 Bill Stark – bass guitar
 Andy White – drums
 The Four Jays (Joe McKinley, J Bretton, Johnny Morgan and Jonie Chalmers) – backing vocals

Charts

References

1960 singles
1960 songs
Decca Records singles
Billy Fury songs
Songs written by Billy Fury